County routes in Steuben County, New York, are maintained by the Steuben County highway department and signed with the Manual on Uniform Traffic Control Devices-standard yellow-on-blue pentagon shield. No county routes enter the cities of Corning or Hornell, and only two enter a village. Most primary through roads in Steuben County are either county routes or New York state highways.

Routes 1–50

Routes 51–100

Routes 101 and up

See also

County routes in New York
List of former state routes in New York (201–300)

Notes

References

External links

Empire State Roads – Steuben County Roads